The men's hammer throw at the 2010 World Junior Championships in Athletics was held at the Moncton 2010 Stadium on 23 & 25 July.  The final was won by American Conor McCullough.  A six-kilogram ball was used throughout the competition.

Medalists

Records
Prior to the competition, the existing world junior and championship records were as follows.

The following records were established during the competition:

Results

Final
25 July

Key: CR = Championship record, NJR = National junior record, PB = Personal best

Qualifications
23 July

Group A

Group B

Participation
According to an unofficial count, 34 athletes from 27 countries participated in the event.

References

External links
2010 World Junior Championships - Men's hammer throw (qualification). IAAF. Retrieved on 2010-07-25.
2010 World Junior Championships - Men's hammer throw (final). IAAF. Retrieved on 2010-07-25.
13th IAAF World Junior Championships Facts & Figures. IAAF. Retrieved on 2010-07-25.

Hammer throw
Hammer throw at the World Athletics U20 Championships